Deyal (Bengali: দেয়াল, Translation: Wall) is a 2013 political/historical novel by Bangladeshi writer Humayun Ahmed, based on the socio-political crisis in the aftermath of the war of independence of Bangladesh. It was the last novel of the writer and was published one year after his death. The publication of the book was delayed by a High Court verdict.

Background 
In the midst of 2011, Ahmed started writing the book and after writing the first five chapters, these parts were published in Anyadin magazine. After a long period, while he was in treatment of cancer in United States, he again started writing the novel, but he died before completing the last part of the work. The novel was written according to several well-known historical literatures following the events after liberation war, including Bangladesh: A Legacy of Blood by Anthony Mascarenhas.

Characters 

 Obonti 
 Shafiq
 Sarfaraz Khan
 Isabella
 Shamim Sikder
 Radhanath
 Sheikh Mujibur Rahman
 Khaled Mosharraf 
 Syed Nazrul Islam 
 Tajuddin Ahmad
 AHM Qamaruzzaman
M Monsur Ali
Major Syed Faruque Rahman
Major Rashid
Khondaker Mostaq Ahmad
Lieutenant General Ziaur Rahman
Major General Khaled Mosharraf
Major General Monjur
 Indian spy Kao
 Major Rashid
 Major Dalim
 Qader Bangladeshi-tea seller
 Colonel Taher
 Captain Ishtiaq
 Captain Faruq
 Chanu Bhai
 Dora Rasna
 Major Naser
 Awami Leaguer Mojammel
 Pir Hamid Kutubi
 Hafez Jahangir
 Captain Shams
 Andha Pir

Controversy 
Before being published, there was controversy over the accuracy of a section of the book, that related to the killing of Sheikh Russel in the 15 August 1975 Bangladesh Coup d'état, and a case was brought in the Bangladesh High Court by Attorney General Mahbubey Alam. According to the high court's order, the first part of the book had to be changed and the Government was ordered to provide Humayun Ahmed with a copy of the verdict on the killing so that he might correct factual inaccuracies.

Reception 
Deyal was a best seller in the 2013 Ekushey Book Fair. In 2013, Justices AHM Shamsuddin Choudhury and Sheikh Md Zakir Hossain of the Bangladesh High Court issued a verdict challenging the execution of Colonel Abu Taher in which they made references to Deyal.

See also
 Jochona O Jononir Golpo
 Assassination of Sheikh Mujibur Rahman

References

External links 
 Deyal on Goodreads

2013 novels
Novels by Humayun Ahmed
Bangladesh Liberation War books
Bangladesh Liberation War fiction
Cultural depictions of Sheikh Mujibur Rahman